The 1999 UEFA European Under-16 Championship was the 17th edition of UEFA's European Under-16 Football Championship. Czech Republic hosted the championship, from 24 April to 7 May 1999. 16 teams entered the competition, and Spain defeated Poland in the final to win the competition for the fifth time.

Squads

Qualifying

Participants

Group stage

Group A

Group B

Group C

Group D

Knockout stage

Quarter-finals

Semi-finals

Third place play-off

Final

References
 UEFA European U-17 C'ship – uefa.com
 RSSSF > UEFA European U-17 Championship > 1999

 
UEFA
UEFA European Under-17 Championship
International association football competitions hosted by the Czech Republic
Football
Youth football in the Czech Republic
UEFA European Under-16 Championship
UEFA European Under-16 Championship
UEFA European Under-16 Championship